= American Progressive Telugu Association =

American non-profit organization

America Progressive Telugu Association
- Founded: 2008
- Founders: Prasad Sammeta (Founding Chairman)
- Type: Organization for networking of Telugu people living in the United States
- Location: Overland Park, Kansas State
- Origins: NRI Telugu population in the United States
- Region served: United States of America
- Owner: APTA
- President: Madhu Vulli
- Board Chair: Aruna Dasari
- General Secretary: Vijay Kocherla
- Key people: Prasad Sammeta, Srinivas Chandu (Founding President) and Srini Chimata (Director)
- Website: https://ap-ta.org/

The America Progressive Telugu Association (Telugu: అమెరికన్ ప్రోగ్రసివ్ తెలుగు అస్సోసియేషన్, also referred to as APTA) is a non-profit organization primarily aimed at networking for Telugu people in the United States. It is incorporated in Wichita, Kansas. APTA was founded in January 2008.

The association also provides yearly scholarships for merit students.
